Distractions is the third release on Fat Wreck Chords by punk band The Loved Ones. It is an EP that consists of three original songs and three covers. The covers are "Johnny 99" by Bruce Springsteen from his 1982 album Nebraska, "Lovers Town Revisited" from Billy Bragg's 1983 album Life's a Riot with Spy Vs Spy, and "Coma Girl" by Joe Strummer and The Mescaleros from their 2003 album Streetcore.
"Spy Diddley" and "Lovers Town Revisited" are taken from the band's Keep Your Heart album sessions.

The track "Distracted" was released on the band's MySpace page on January 24, 2009.

Track listing

Personnel 
 Dave Hause – vocals, guitar
 Chris Gonzalez – bass, vocals, guitar
 Mike Sneeringer – drums
 David Walsh – guitar
 Michael "Spider" Cotterman – bass (on tracks 3 and 5)
 Franz Nicolay – organ, piano

References 

The Loved Ones (American band) albums
2009 EPs
Fat Wreck Chords EPs